David Ingle Thodey  (born 14 May 1954) is an Australian businessman who is a former chief executive officer of Telstra and current chairman of accounting software company Xero.

Thodey was born in Perth, Western Australia. He was educated at Nelson College in New Zealand from 1967 to 1971 and holds a Bachelor of Arts in Anthropology and English from Victoria University of Wellington. Thodey attended the Kellogg School of Management postgraduate general management program at Northwestern University in Chicago.

Thodey held several senior executive positions in marketing and sales within IBM Australia/New Zealand and across IBM Asia Pacific, including holding the position of managing director for Australia between 1999 and 2000.

Thodey joined Telstra in April 2001 as group managing director of Telstra Mobiles. He was appointed to the position of Group Managing Director Telstra Enterprise and Government in December 2002 and was responsible for the company's corporate, government and large business customers in Australia, TelstraClear in New Zealand and Telstra's International sales division.  He became chief executive officer of Telstra on 19 May 2009, following the departure of American Sol Trujillo from the office.  Thodey retired from his position at Telstra in April 2015.

Thodey was appointed chair of the CSIRO Board, with effect from November 2015. In 2017 Thodey was appointed an Officer of the Order of Australia for distinguished service to business, notably to the telecommunications and information technology sectors, to the promotion of ethical leadership and workplace diversity, and to basketball.

In May 2018, the then Prime Minister Malcolm Turnbull announced an independent review of the Australian Public Service as a whole, to be chaired by Thodey. The review is to produce “an ambitious program of transformational reforms to ensure the APS is fit-for-purpose for the coming decades, and to guide and accelerate future reform activities”. The review was completed in 2019. It included 40 recommendations. In its response, the government fully agreed to 15 of the recommendations, agreed in part to 20, noted two and rejected three.

References

External links
David Thodey CEO profile - Telstra Executives and Directors

Living people
People from Perth, Western Australia
People educated at Nelson College
Victoria University of Wellington alumni
Kellogg School of Management alumni
Australian chief executives
Telstra people
1954 births
Officers of the Order of Australia
Fellows of the Australian Academy of Technological Sciences and Engineering